Two ships of the British Royal Navy have been named HMS Poictiers. Poictiers is an alternative spelling for Poitiers, and in this instance commemorates the English victory there.

 The first  was a 74-gun third rate launched in 1809. She participated in an action where she rescued  by capturing  in 1812. Poictiers was broken up in 1857.
 The second Poictiers was a 2,380-ton  launched in April 1946, but broken up soon after.

Royal Navy ship names